The largescale silver carp (Hypophthalmichthys harmandi) is a freshwater fish in the carp family Cyprinidae. It is native to Hainan and Vietnam.

References 

Hypophthalmichthys
Carp
Taxa named by Henri Émile Sauvage
Fish described in 1884